Lars Mathias Blank, (born 27 November 1969 in Hilden, Germany) is a German engineer, biologist and professor at the RWTH Aachen University, and head of its Institute of Applied Microbiology.

Career
Blank studied Chemical Engineering from 1990 to 1997 at the University of Dortmund and Biology from 1992 to 1997 at the Ruhr University of Bochum (Germany). For  his master's, he worked in the field of Metabolic Engineering in the group of E. T. Papoutsakis at Northwestern University, IL, USA and in yeast cell biology in the group of Prof. W.-H. Kunau at the Ruhr University of Bochum. He worked for his Ph.D. under  L. K. Nielsen at the University of Queensland, Australia (1998 to 2002), where he developed a continuous process for hyaluronic acid production using lactic acid bacteria. During his Ph.D. he worked as a visiting scientist at the Technical University of Denmark (DtU), Lyngby, Denmark) from September until December 1999. From November 2004 until June 2011.   Blank lead the group Systems Biotechnology at the Laboratory of Chemical Biotechnology at the TU Dortmund and was a senior research fellow at the Leibniz-Institute ISAS in Dortmund. In January 2010 he finalized his Habilitation.

Research
Blank focuses in his research on fundamental and applied aspects of microbial metabolism. Of specific interest is the interaction between the metabolic network and the introduced genetic and environmental perturbations. The research on in silico/in vivo metabolic network operation is aimed at a deeper understanding of cell function, with the ultimate goal of rational cell engineering.
He is associate editor of Engineering in Life Sciences, Microbial Biotechnology, Fungal Biology and Biotechnology, and Metabolic Engineering Communication.

Publications
A list of his publications is available online.

References

Northwestern University alumni
21st-century German engineers
21st-century German biologists
1969 births
Living people
People from Hilden
Engineers from North Rhine-Westphalia